Crepidium flavovirens, commonly known as the green spur orchid, is a plant in the orchid family and is endemic to tropical far North Queensland. It is an evergreen, terrestrial orchid with a fleshy stem, wavy leaves and many yellowish green flowers crowded on a green flowering stem.

Description
The leaves are dark green, shiny and asymmetrical. Flowering occurs between January and May.

Taxonomy and naming
Crepidium flavovirens was first formally described in 1997 by David Jones and Mark Clements from a specimen collected near Malanda. The description was published in the journal Novon. The specific epithet (flavovirens) is from the Latin words flavus meaning “golden-yellow” or "yellow" and virens meaning "green".

Distribution and habitat
The green spur orchid grows in leaf litter, often on steep slopes near streams in rainforest between Mossman and Tully.

References 

flavovirens
Orchids of Queensland
Plants described in 1997